The 2021 Sahlen's Six Hours of The Glen was an endurance sports car race sanctioned by the International Motor Sports Association (IMSA). The race was held at Watkins Glen International in Watkins Glen, New York on June 27, 2021. This race was the fifth round of the 2021 IMSA SportsCar Championship, and the third round of the 2021 Michelin Endurance Cup.

Background
The race marked IMSA's return to Watkins Glen after the previous year's edition of the event was canceled as a result of the COVID-19 pandemic. With the cancellation of the scheduled event at Canadian Tire Motorsport Park prompting the running of the WeatherTech 240, the six hour race became the first of two races in as many weeks at the track.

On June 18, 2021, IMSA released the latest technical bulletin outlining Balance of Performance for the event. In DPi, The Acura and Cadillac received slight fuel capacity reductions at one and two liters respectively, while the Mazda featured a 3.6 kW horsepower increase. The two GT classes saw minor adjustments, with the GTLM-class Porsche receiving a 10 kg weight reduction, while the Aston Martin received a 7.1 kW horsepower decrease and a two-liter fuel capacity decrease after winning the previous round at Belle Isle.

Entries

A total of 38 cars took part in the event, split across five classes. 7 cars were entered in DPi, 5 in LMP2, 7 in LMP3, 5 in GTLM, and 14 in GTD. The pre-event entry list contained 40 entries, but both Sean Creech Motorsport and Forty7 Motorsports withdrew their LMP3 entries before the start of the weekend.

DPi featured the expected addition of the Ally Cadillac Racing #48 alongside the six full-season entries in the class. Four of the seven teams also elected to add a third driver to their lineups. In LMP2, United Autosports returned as part of their Michelin Endurance Cup schedule, while James French joined Tower Motorsport By Starworks for the first time in 2021. LMP3 featured a series of additions, including Marco Andretti's addition to the Andretti Autosport entry, United Autosports' IMSA LMP3 debut, and the long-awaited first IMSA SportsCar Championship appearance for Dawson Racing. GTLM saw the return of WeatherTech Racing after they missed the previous round at Detroit, while BMW Team RLL returned as part of their Endurance Cup campaign. In GTD, CarBahn with Peregrine Racing added another event to their Sprint Cup schedule, and NTE Sport returned after most recently appearing at Daytona in January. Wright Motorsports also announced prior to the event that Trent Hindman would replace Ryan Hardwick as Patrick Long's co-driver for the remainder of the season.

Qualifying
Ricky Taylor secured overall pole for the event. Steven Thomas won the pole in LMP2, while Austin McCusker scored pole in LMP3. Antonio García started first in GTLM, and Kyle Kirkwood took pole in GTD.

Qualifying results

Results

References

External links

Sahlen's Six Hours of The Glen
Sahlen's Six Hours of The Glen
Sahlen's Six Hours of The Glen